Celestino Pérez (born 24 February 1948) is a Puerto Rican former swimmer who competed in the 1964 Summer Olympics.

References

1948 births
Living people
Puerto Rican male swimmers
Puerto Rican male freestyle swimmers
Male medley swimmers
Olympic swimmers of Puerto Rico
People from Caguas, Puerto Rico
Swimmers at the 1963 Pan American Games
Swimmers at the 1964 Summer Olympics
Central American and Caribbean Games gold medalists for Puerto Rico
Competitors at the 1966 Central American and Caribbean Games
Central American and Caribbean Games medalists in swimming
Pan American Games competitors for Puerto Rico
20th-century Puerto Rican people